WCKS (102.7 FM, "Kiss 102.7") is a radio station licensed to the community of Fruithurst, Alabama, United States, and serving Carrollton, Georgia, as well as West Georgia and East Alabama. The station is owned by Gradick Communications and the broadcast licensee is WCKS, LLC.

Programming
The station plays a Contemporary Hit Radio music format. It has the slogan of "Your Music Station."

History
"Kiss 102.7" was established in Carrollton, Georgia, in July 1994. Known by the simple call sign WCKS, the station was forced to use WCKS-FM from 2004 through 2006 when AM radio station WNSI was acquired by the Gradick family and its call sign changed to WCKS. On November 29, 1996, the AM station became WCKA so on December 12, 2006, this FM station was able to resume its WCKS identification.

References

External links
 Kiss 102.7 FM WCKS official website
 

CKS
Radio stations established in 1994
1994 establishments in Alabama
Contemporary hit radio stations in the United States